Michael Timothy Shildt (born August 9, 1968) is an American baseball coach for the San Diego Padres, where he is the team's interim third base coach. 

After serving as a scout and manager in the St. Louis Cardinals minor league system, he served as the first-base coach for the Cardinals in 2017 and was named the club's manager in 2018 after the dismissal of Mike Matheny. The 2019 Cardinals advanced to the National League Championship Series and he was named NL Manager of the Year. The 2020 and 2021 seasons  ended in losses at the National League Wild Card Game. Shildt was dismissed as Cardinals manager on October 14, 2021. He was hired by the San Diego Padres on January 26, 2022, in a player-development role, and stepped in as the team's third-base coach to begin the 2022 season after Matt Williams had hip surgery.

Early career
Born in Charlotte, North Carolina, Shildt played high school baseball at Olympic High School and college baseball for University of North Carolina (UNC) Asheville Bulldogs. After his playing career ended as he "couldn't hit a curve ball", Shildt became a coach at West Charlotte High School where he helped bring the baseball team their first winning season in 20 years. After leaving the high school, Shildt was hired by UNC Charlotte to become an assistant coach for the Charlotte 49ers baseball team. He held the position for five years. During the off-season he owned a baseball training facility in North Carolina, becoming a full-time baseball instructor to area youths.

St. Louis Cardinals system

Minor leagues
Shildt started his Major League Baseball career as an associate scout with the league for three seasons. He moved on to the St. Louis Cardinals organization, working as the area scout for North Carolina, South Carolina and Virginia. On a recommendation from future Cardinals general manager John Mozeliak, Shildt began his minor league coaching career as a part-time coach. Shildt was sent to the Cardinals' Single-A affiliate in the New York–Penn League. He was a part-time coach during 2004 and 2005, while continuing his scouting duties. He was promoted to a full-time coaching position in 2006, and kept coaching with the single A affiliate until the 2007 season. In 2008, Shildt coordinated the Cardinals' minor league spring training workout camp. Afterwards he became the hitting coach for the Johnson City Cardinals for the 2008 season.

Shildt was promoted to manage Johnson City in 2009, where he finished with a 37–30 record. In his second season, Johnson City posted a 42–24 win–loss record, and after defeating its two playoff opponents, won the Appalachian League championship. For his effort, Shildt was named St. Louis Cardinals Minor League Manager of the Year by Scout.com. He was also named the Appalachian League Manager of the Year. Among the players he helped improve during the season include Appalachian League's Pitcher of the Year Ryan Copeland, and batting average champion Phil Cerreto. After Johnson City's season ended, Shildt was invited to spend some time on the St. Louis Cardinals roster in order to gain experience. After the season, Shildt was awarded the Appalachian League Manager of the Year award, and the George Kissell Award for his "excellence in player development" by the St. Louis Cardinals organization.

Johnson City repeated as league champions in 2011 under Shildt. It was the first time that Johnson City clinched two consecutive league championships since 1975–1976. Shildt managed the Springfield Cardinals of the Class AA Texas League for three seasons. Shildt guided Springfield to its first Texas League championship before being recognized as Baseball Americas Team of the Year in 2012. He then spent two seasons as the manager for the Memphis Redbirds of the Class AAA Pacific Coast League.

Major leagues
Shildt was again promoted in 2017, this time to the MLB team, as the quality control coach. After a rough start to the 2017 season, third base coach Chris Maloney was reassigned in the organization, and Shildt became the full-time Cardinals third base coach for the rest of the 2017 season. When José Oquendo was brought back for the 2018 season to be the Cardinals' third base coach, Shildt became the team's bench coach for the 2018 season.

On July 14, 2018, Shildt was made interim manager of the Cardinals following the firing of Mike Matheny. He became only the eighth man to manage a Major League Baseball team despite not having ever played professional baseball at any level. On July 15, 2018, he collected his first major league managerial win in a 6–4 victory over the Cincinnati Reds. Bob Nightengale of USA Today tweeted on August 28, 2018 that the team would remove the interim tag from Shildt's title and name him the club's permanent manager, awarding him a three-year contract. Shildt won his 100th game as Cardinals manager with a 6–2 win over the Pittsburgh Pirates on August 9, 2019, his 51st birthday. Following a 3–2 win over the Chicago Cubs on September 22, 2019, the Cardinals clinched a playoff berth for the first time in Shildt's career as manager, and the first for the team since 2015. He was named the National League Manager of the Year.

The Cardinals reached the playoffs in a shortened 2020 Major League Baseball season, losing in the Wild Card series. During the 2021 season, the Cardinals won 17 games in a row, the longest winning streak in franchise history. They clinched the second Wild Card spot, but lost in the National League Wild Card Game on a two out, two-run, walk-off home run given up by Alex Reyes in the bottom of the ninth inning.

On October 14, 2021, the Cardinals announced Shildt would not return in the 2022 season having been fired due to "philosophical differences." He was nominated for National League Manager of the Year following the season's end, and came in third as the award was won by San Francisco Giants Manager Gabe Kapler.

After leaving the Cardinals, Shildt was hired by MLB. On January 26, 2022, Shildt was hired by the San Diego Padres to serve in a player development role. However, he began the season as the Padres' interim third base coach after Matt Williams had hip surgery during spring training.

Managerial record

Personal life
Shildt married his long-time fiancee, Michele Segrave, on March 6, 2020 in Jupiter, Florida. They have two daughters. Shildt is a Christian.

References

External links

Baseball coaches from North Carolina
Major League Baseball bench coaches
San Diego Padres coaches
St. Louis Cardinals managers
St. Louis Cardinals scouts
Charlotte 49ers baseball coaches
UNC Asheville Bulldogs baseball players
1968 births
Living people
Memphis Redbirds managers